Stuart McDonald may refer to:

Stuart McDonald (cartoonist) (born 1931), cartoonist for the Grand Forks Herald
Stuart McDonald (Australian politician) (1928–2017), leader of the National Party in the Victorian Legislative Council
Stuart McDonald (Scottish politician) (born 1978), Scottish MP for Cumbernauld, Kilsyth and Kirkintilloch East

See also
Stewart McDonald (disambiguation)
Stewart MacDonald (born 1967), Scottish Labour Party local government councillor